The Bronfay Farm Military Cemetery is a military cemetery located in the Somme region of France commemorating British, Commonwealth, and French soldiers who fought in the Battle of the Somme in World War I. The cemetery contains mainly those who died between October 1914 and February 1917 and in 1918 near Bronfay Farm and the nearby village of Bray.

Location 
The cemetery is located a short distance southeast of Bronfay Farm, which is 3 kilometers northeast of the village of Bray-sur-Somme. Bray-sur-Somme is approximately 8 kilometers southeast of Albert, France.

Establishment of the cemetery 

The cemetery was established by French troops in October 1914. It was used by Commonwealth troops, in particular the British XIV Corps Main Dressing Station from August 1915 to February 1917. Burials were also added between March and September 1918, during the German spring offensive. After the end of the war, Bronfay Farm and Bray casualties from the latter period were reburied in the cemetery. The modern day cemetery was designed by Sir Edwin Lutyens and George Hartley Goldsmith.

Galerie

Statistics 
There are a total of 537 burials in the cemetery, of which 525 are identified and 12 are unidentified. There is a special memorial dedicated to two soldiers believed to be buried among the unknown.

References 

World War I cemeteries in France